"Thru the Glass" is a song by Cornish alternative rock band Thirteen Senses from their debut album, The Invitation. It was originally released on 1 March 2004 as their debut single on Vertigo Records but did not chart. It was later re-released as the third single from The Invitation in the United Kingdom on 10 January 2005. The re-release peaked at  18 on the UK Singles Chart and No. 91 in the Netherlands.

The limited-edition single was released on compact disc and 7-inch vinyl formats. Both tracks of the original release are remixed and remastered from the Falls in the Dark demo album sessions.

Track listings

Original version
CD single
 "Thru the Glass" – 4:40
 "No Other Life is Attractive" – 5:45

Limited 7-inch single
 "Thru the Glass" – 4:40
 "No Other Life is Attractive" – 5:45

Re-release
CD1
 "Thru the Glass" (single version) – 3:26
 "Lights Out" – 3:08

CD 2
 "Thru the Glass" (alternative single edit) – 3:34
 "Picture This" – 4:00
 "Turn Out the Light" – 4:22

Limited 7-inch single
 "Thru the Glass" (album version) – 4:37
 "Losers" – 3:38

Charts

Use in media
"Thru the Glass" was used as the background music in the Series Two finale of Waterloo Road, and continues to be played over the end credits instead of the normal title music.

References

2004 debut singles
2004 songs
2005 singles
Mercury Records singles
Thirteen Senses songs